Sleep No More is the first studio album by American hip hop producer DJ Signify. It was released on Lex Records on April 20, 2004. It features guest appearances from Sage Francis and Buck 65. The album peaked at number 86 on the CMJ Top 200 chart.

Critical reception

Joshua Glazer of AllMusic gave the album 3 stars out of 5, saying: "Listening to the beats on DJ Signify's debut release, there are moments of terrific innovation, but equal amounts of utterly dated trip-hop dirge." Rollie Pemberton of Pitchfork gave the album an 8.7 out of 10, commenting that "Sleep No Mores brilliant journey into sample-based experimentation easily places DJ Signify in a league with the genre's best-known producers." Noel Dix of Exclaim! wrote: "Certainly not something you want to throw on when you want to cheer yourself up, DJ Signify likes using chilling horn samples and dirty drums at a slow pace to piece together a soundtrack to an imaginary horror flick."

Track listing

Personnel
Credits adapted from liner notes.

 DJ Signify – production, arrangement, mixing
 Sage Francis – vocals (2, 6, 11)
 Buck 65 – vocals (4, 7, 13, 16)
 Sixtoo – additional drums (7), engineering
 Elektro4 – co-production (7), mixing
 Ehquestionmark – artwork

References

External links
 

2004 debut albums
DJ Signify albums
Lex Records albums